Missouri's 27th Senatorial District is one of 34 districts in the Missouri Senate. The district is based in Southeast Missouri and includes all of the counties of Bollinger, Cape Girardeau, Madison, Mississippi, Perry, and Scott.

The district is currently represented by Republican Holly Rehder.

District Profile
Major cities in the district include Cape Girardeau, Sikeston, Jackson, Perryville, Charleston, Scott City, and Fredericktown. The district is home to Southeast Missouri State University.

The district, anchored in the GOP stronghold of Cape Girardeau County, is heavily Republican. Although Democrats are competitive in local/countywide elections, Republicans dominate in state and federal elections in the district. The district has only backed a Democratic statewide candidate once in the past 12 years: former Governor Mel Carnahan in 1996.

Demographics
According to the 2010 U.S. Census:
Population: 172,783
White/Caucasian: 89.01%
Black/African American: 7.74%
Hispanic/Latino: 1.78%
Two or More Races: 1.48%
Some Other Race: 0.77%
Asian: 0.70%
Native American: 0.28%
Pacific Islander: 0.02%

Voting in Statewide Elections

Election results

2008

2004

2000

1996

Missouri General Assembly
Missouri State Senate districts